The 1940–41 Serie A season was the 13th season of the Serie A, the top level of ice hockey in Italy. Four teams participated in the championship, which was won by AC Milanese DG.

Qualification
AC Milanese DG II - AC Milanese DG III 5:1
AC Milanese DG II - Juventus Torino 6:2

Final
AC Milanese DG - AC Milanese DG II 20:0

External links
 Season on hockeytime.net

1940–41 in Italian ice hockey
Serie A (ice hockey) seasons
Italy